Richard Reyes Faulkerson Jr. (born January 2, 1992), popularly known as Alden Richards, is a Filipino actor, recording artist, television host, entrepreneur and producer. He is dubbed as "The Asia's Multimedia Star" after receiving the Asian Star Prize awards in 14th Seoul International Drama Awards of 2019 for acting.

Richards rose to fame (first ever biggest break) when he was paired with Maine Mendoza, where he became the other half of their loveteam, AlDub. His notable works include Tween Hearts, One True Love, Carmela, The Road, Ilustrado, Imagine You and Me, Victor Magtanggol, Hello, Love, Goodbye, The Gift, The World Between Us and Start-Up PH. As a recording artist, he has released albums and singles under Universal Records and GMA Music.

Richards is currently hosting for variety shows consisting of Eat Bulaga! and All-Out Sundays.

Early life
Named after his father, Alden Richards was born as Richard Reyes Faulkerson, Jr. on January 2, 1992, in Quezon City and was raised in Santa Rosa, Laguna. He is the second child of Richard Peralta Faulkerson, Sr. of Ermita, Manila and Rosario Reyes, a native of Pampanga. He has three siblings, an older brother and two younger sisters. Richards's paternal grandfather, whom he never met, was American.

Growing up, Richards wanted to be a pilot but his mother urged him to pursue acting instead. 
After his mother died, to support his family financially and to fulfill his mother's wish for him to be an actor, Richards decided to join various male beauty pageants in Laguna and worked as a part-time commercial model. He holds the titles Ginoong Sta Rosa 2009 and Ginoong Laguna 2010. He auditioned for the reality television shows StarStruck and Pinoy Big Brother: Teen Clash of 2010, but both auditions failed. He also appeared in various commercials, including a telecommunication company, clothing line, fast-food chain and multivitamins.  He studied at Paco Catholic School in Paco, Manila and at Colegio de Santa Rosa de Lima High School, where he graduated.  He began, but has not completed, a Business Management Degree at De La Salle Canlubang in Laguna.

Acting career

2010–2011: Breakthrough, The Road and recognition

After doing modelling stints, Alden auditioned for an acting role on the GMA Network's afternoon soap, Alakdana. He passed the audition and played the role of Joma.  In Alakdana, he was paired with the lead actress Louise delos Reyes. When he became an actor, he used the stage name Alden Richards.  In 2011, he was included in the teenage series, Tween Hearts and also starred in its film adaptation Tween Hearts: Class of 2012. He also performed on GMA Network's Sunday variety shows Party Pilipinas and Sunday All Stars. He also appeared in the comedy-horror show Spooky Nights. Richards was praised with his performance as a psychopath in the film The Road. By the end of 2011, he replaced Aljur Abrenica's role as Gobi in Ang Panday 2, which is an entry at the 2011 Metro Manila Film Festival. Abrenica was pulled out of the film due to conflict of schedules and Richards re-shoots scenes made by Abrenica.  Richards was also praised by some entertainment writers for his performances, predicting that he would be the next big star of GMA Network.

Alden was awarded as the 1st Filipino Amazing Male Newcomer in the first Yahoo! OMG! Philippines Awards in 2011. He also won as Best New Actor in the Golden Screen Awards in the same year. He invited FHM Sexiest of 2011 Sam Pinto for a date on national TV. The latter did accept the invitation and went on a cruise date with Richards in Manila Bay, but the actress revealed that it was just a friendly date. On Valentine's Day of 2012, A Date with Alden Richards, a GMA Network promo, was held on national television and the micro-blogging site Twitter where it trended.

2012–2014: One True Love, Ilustrado and music career
In 2012, Alden played the supporting role of a thief named Rico on the prime time series, My Beloved headlined by Marian Rivera and Dingdong Dantes. He also acted on the episode "UNOS" (Calamity) of the fourth season of a Holy Week special, Tanikala, presented by Christian Broadcasting Network. Richards starred in his first lead role on a prime time TV series with One True Love, which premiered on June 11, 2012, and was paired again with Louise delos Reyes.  In the series, Richards who played "Tisoy" is a poor guy who is in love with a rich girl.  According to him, the series was his biggest break in the show business industry. Richard's earned his first Best Actor nomination for One True Love in the 2013 Golden Screen TV Awards.  It took a while before he had a new television or film project until he was cast as young Simeon (the character played by Bong Revilla) in the historical drama Indio in 2013. According to Richards, he is proud to play the role as young Simeon.

The story of Alden's life was featured on drama anthology, Magpakailanman aired in March 2013 (re-aired on September 12, 2015) wherein he portrayed himself. In the same year, Richards and delos Reyes was paired again in the GMA Network melodrama series entitled Mundo Mo'y Akin with actresses Sunshine Dizon and Angelika dela Cruz. Richards' portrayal on the show earned him another nomination at the 5th Golden Screen TV Awards. On October 25, 2013, Richards signed an exclusive contract with GMA Network.

Alden debuted as a singer through the #SummerCrush episode of the Sunday noontime show, Party Pilipinas in April 2013. He launched his first single, "Haplos", a revival of Shamrock's hit song, which surfaced in My Music Store and iTunes on April 5, 2013. The self-titled debut album, Alden Richards, under Universal Records, was released on May 26, 2013. The track "Haplos" was used as soundtrack on his prime time show Mundo Mo'y Akin. Meanwhile, "Di Na Mababawi" and "Sa Aking Tabi" were used as theme songs for the Filipino-dubbed version koreanovela My Daughter, Seoyoung and morning drama With a Smile respectively. He was featured as Myx Celebrity VJ for the month of June 2013. For his song "Haplos", Richards was nominated in the "Best Performance by a New Recording Artist" category in the 27th Awit Awards. On the 6th Star Awards for Music, Richards was nominated for "New Male Recording Artist for the Year" while his self-titled album was nominated for "Album Cover Design and Concept of the Year".

In 2014, Alden was paired with Marian Rivera in the television series Carmela.  The song "Naaalala Ka" from his self-titled album, served as the ending theme for Carmela. He also starred in a short film entitled Kinabukasan with veteran Filipina actress Nora Aunor.  He hosted Bet ng Bayan, a talent search television program of GMA Network, together with Regine Velasquez.  Close to the end of 2014, he had another television series produced by GMA News and Public Affairs entitled Ilustrado. He played the role of Filipino patriot José Rizal that gave Richards his first Best Actor award from the 29th PMPC Star Awards for Television. He was the only nominee from his home network against a field of respected actors from the rival television network.

2015–present: Eat Bulaga!'s AlDub and Asia's Multimedia Actor

In 2015, Alden became part of the Philippines' longest running noontime variety show, Eat Bulaga! He appeared as a host in the segment "That's My Bae". On July 16, 2015, Richards was unintentionally paired to his Eat Bulaga! co-host Maine "Yaya Dub" Mendoza during an episode of the "Juan for All, All for Juan" segment.  They instantly became a love team, dubbed as AlDub. Because of their popularity, Eat Bulaga! created a mini-series for AlDub labeled by Joey de Leon as Kalyeserye. In Kalyeserye, Richards plays different roles including fictionalized version of himself and as Anselmo.

On August 6, 2015, Alden signed a four-year film contract with APT Entertainment, the film outfit of Eat Bulaga! producer TAPE Inc. In the same month, Richards signed a recording contract with GMA Records. Richards' second album, Wish I May, was launched on October 17, 2015, in SM City North EDSA Cinema 11. The album contains two original songs and the rest are renditions. The first single, "Wish I May," is an original composition by Agat Obar-Morallo and was released earlier for online downloading and streaming in September 2015. The music video of "Wish I May" premiered on October 18, 2015, on GMA Network's Sunday noontime show Sunday PinaSaya, where Richards is also a co-host. The single landed on the top spot of iTunes Philippines song charts.  The song "Wish I May" is used as the theme song for the series with the same name. The sophomore album earned a gold record award from Philippine Association of the Record Industry (PARI) prior to being officially launched.

In September 2015, Alden's self-titled debut album earned a gold record award recognition from PARI and ranked number 10 on Billboards World Albums Charts (Billboard). In October 2015, Universal Records released a special edition of the debut album which included AlDub theme song "God Gave Me You" by Bryan White.  In the same month, the album Wish I May received a platinum record award from PARI for selling more than 15,000 copies. In November 2015, his debut album Alden Richards has been certified platinum.  As for the album Wish I May, it went on to earn a number of recognition from PARI as it received double platinum in December 2015, triple platinum award on January 21, 2016,  quadruple platinum award on February 28, 2016, five times platinum record in March 2016, seven times platinum in July 2016, and eight times platinum in September 2016.

The theme song for GMA Network's Christmas station ID entitled "MaGMAhalan Tayo Ngayong Pasko" was performed by Alden in 2015. Aside from singing the theme song, Richards also appeared on the station ID music video with Maine Mendoza and the Kalyeserye's lolas (Jose Manalo, Wally Bayola and Paolo Ballesteros).  In December 2015, Richards and Mendoza starred in the 41st Metro Manila Film Festival entry My Bebe Love#KiligPaMore. The film headlined by Vic Sotto and Ai-Ai delas Alas and was directed by Jose Javier Reyes. Also in December 2015, Richards together with Mendoza were also given a German Moreno Power Tandem Award. Richards received a star at the Philippine Walk of Fame on December 1, 2015, at Eastwood City, Libis, Quezon City along with his "Kalyeserye" co-stars.

In March 2016, Alden and Maine starred in God Gave Me You, a Lenten season drama special of Eat Bulaga!  In July 2016, Imagine You and Me was shown in cinemas as AlDub's first anniversary offering to fans. In the film, Richards and Mendoza played star-crossed lovers and were lead actors for the first time. In August 2016, Richards released a book entitled Alden Richards: In My Own Words under Summit Media. Aside from being a regular host in Eat Bulaga! and Sunday PinaSaya, Richards' television appearances in 2016 included his participation as a contestant in Lip Sync Battle Philippines and as a guest in the television series That's My Amboy, where he portrayed himself.

In September 2016, Alden was included in the reboot series of Encantadia as Lakan (a Mulawin character).  His first appearance in said fantasy series generated public interest and became a trending topic in a social media website. In the same month, Richards renewed his contract with GMA Network.

In February 2017, "Destined to be Yours"; Alden Richards' first television series opposite his love team partner, Maine Mendoza was shown on GMA Network.

Alden played the lead in the docudrama Alaala: A Martial Law Special as real-life activist Bonifacio Ilagan. Richards said it was the most difficult role he has had to tackle as an actor. The show, first broadcast in September 2017, co-starred Bianca Umali as Rizalina Ilagan, Rocco Nacino, and Gina Alajar, and was directed by Adolfo Alix Jr. and written by Bonifacio Ilagan. The special won the silver medal in the docudrama category at the New York Festivals television and film awards. Richards and program manager Joy Madrigal received the award for GMA at the awarding ceremonies.

In October 2017, Alden and Maine headlined in an Eat Bulaga! produced television film entitled Love Is... with Adolfo Alix Jr. as the director.

In 2018, he portrayed the titular role in the Philippine television drama action fantasy series Victor Magtanggol.

After being on movie hiatus for almost 3 years, Richards starred in a 2019 movie under Star Cinema, and he was paired with Kathryn Bernardo in Hello, Love, Goodbye, directed by Cathy Garcia-Molina. The film became the highest grossing Filipino film of all time surpassing The Hows of Us, which is also starred by Bernardo.

In 2020, Richards joined as the lead host and one of the performers in the musical-comedy variety show All-Out Sundays, after the cancellation of its predecessor Sunday PinaSaya, where he previously co-hosted.

Other ventures

Modeling and endorsements
Aside from being an actor, Alden Richards also does modeling stints. In 2010, he ranked 4th on the list of Candy Magazine's "Celebrity Cuties" and had his earliest modeling gig at the Candy Fair held in Pasig. Richards is a brand ambassador for a clothing brand along with co-actors JM De Guzman and Enrique Gil. In July 2012, Richards, along with Bela Padilla, Kris Bernal, and Sarah Lahbati, appeared on the cover of MEGA Magazine dubbed as "GMA's new breed of rising talents". Since then he has continued to appear in a number of magazines, while featuring in several endorsements.

Philanthropy
In 2014, Alden became an ambassador for Habitat for Humanity Philippines.  In January 2015, Richards celebrated his birthday by building homes alongside other volunteers and families involved with the non-profit organization in Payatas, Quezon City. While in February 2016, as part of his post-birthday celebration, Richards visits Aeta community in Tarlac for an outreach program.  After the devastation of Typhoon Haiyan in the Philippines in 2013, Richards had been part of relief efforts initiated by GMA Network. Richards was also part GMA Network's 2014 Christmas campaign, #ShareTheLove, where he chose children with cancer as his beneficiaries.

Alden became Boardwalk's ambassador for Young Emerging Sociopreneurs (YES) in September 2015. The campaign is focused on encouraging students to earn money while still in school. Richards also participated in Boardwalk's Share Campaign where part of the proceeds goes to charity. Richards was part of Eat Bulaga! Sa Tamang Panahon concert on October 24, 2015, held at the Philippine Arena where 14 million pesos was raised for the program's AlDub Library Project.

The GMA Network Christmas station ID theme song "MaGMAhalan Tayo Ngayong Pasko", performed by Alden, was released for online downloads. All proceeds went to the beneficiaries of GMA Kapuso Foundation's relief efforts for victims of Typhoon Lando. Richards also appeared on a charity event for children with serious diseases and a benefit concert entitled For The Love Of Mama on November 23, 2015, at the Mall of Asia Arena, where proceeds were used for building the Kristong Hari Parish Church in Quezon City. On April 3, 2016, Richards joined other artists in a worship concert entitled Reborn: 1 Walker Worship Concert at the Mall of Asia Arena. Organized by 1Walker Band headed by Regine Velasquez, the worship concert's proceeds were given to the Anawim Lay Missions Foundation, Inc.

In August 2016, Alden announced that he plans to set up his own foundation to reach out to more people who are in need.

In 2022, He established his own business venture Myriad Corporation, a company that organized the reunion concert of rock band Eraserheads entitled Huling El Bimbo, where Richards served as the co-producer.

Ambassador
In July 2020, Alden was chosen as an ambassador of Bida Solusyon, an informative campaign formed by the Department of Health about the health protocols in preventing the spread of COVID-19. He is also the ambassador for the Philippines of End Tuberculosis, a campaign formed by the USAID.

Personal life
Richards credits his paternal grandmother, Linda, with rearing him in the Catholic faith. According to Richards, he would visit seven churches, read the epic poem Pasyon, and watch Christian-themed films such as The Passion of the Christ, The Ten Commandments, Jesus of Nazareth, and The Gospel of John during Lent.

Alden resides in Santa Rosa, Laguna. In Fast Talk with Boy Abunda, he stated that he almost dated actresses Winwyn Marquez and Julie Anne San Jose in the past.

Filmography

Television

Film

Discography

Albums

Soundtrack albums

Compilation albums

Singles

Other singles

Concerts

Solo major concerts

Digital concerts

Documentary concerts

Videography

Music videos

Guest appearances

Accolades

Alden Richards and Maine Mendoza (AlDub)
The prestigious Guinness World Records recognized AlDub as a record-breaker in Twitter history for generating 40,706,392 tweets in the "Tamang Panahon" event at the Philippine Arena.

Solo awards
Aside from major award giving bodies, Richards was given recognition by other organizations and magazines.  In the 1st Yahoo! Philippines OMG! Awards in 2011, he was recognized as the Amazing Male Newcomer, while in 2012 and 2013, the same award-giving body nominated him as the Breakthrough Actor of the Year but lost.  Richards together with Louise delos Reyes also got nominated in the Yahoo! Philippines OMG! Awards in 2013 as Love Team of the Year but they lost.

During the MEG Top Choice Awards In 2012, the magazine MEG gave Richards the Top Fashion Forward Celeb (Male) award. While in the Inquirer Bandera's 1st Bet ng Bandera Awards, he was given the title Male Celebrity of the Year.  As for the PUSH Awards 2015 by ABS-CBN Interactive, he was nominated Awesome OOTD King but did not win.  Stargate PeopleAsia magazine granted the title People of the Year (People's Choice Award) to Richards and Mendoza in 2016.

In the 5th OFW Gawad Parangal in 2014, Richards became the Favorite Young Actor. Being an endorser, he was given the Trinitian Awardee for Most Valuable Male Advertising Endorser during Platinum Stallion Awards (Awards for Advertising) in 2016.  The actor was also given a Makabatang Alagad ng Telebisyon  (Child-friendly Artist on Television) seal by Anak TV in February 2016.  During the 32nd PMPC Star Awards for Movies in 2016, he was nominated but lost the Darling of the Press award. He also won Male TV Star of the Year and Male Stylish Star of the Year for 2016 and Best PEPTalk episode on PEPList Awards Year 3 given by Philippine Entertainment Portal.

|-
| rowspan="4"|2011
| 1st Yahoo! OMG Awards
| Amazing Male Newcomer 
| 
|-
| 59th FAMAS Awards
| German Moreno Youth Achievement Award 
| 
|-
| Golden Screen TV Awards
| Outstanding Breakthrough Performance by an Actor for Alakdana
| 
|-
| 25th PMPC Star Awards for Television
| Best New Male TV Personality for Alakdana 
| 
|-
| rowspan="2"|2012
| Golden Screen TV Awards
| Breakthrough Performance by an Actor for The Road
| 
|-
| 28th PMPC Star Awards for Movies
| New Movie Actor of the Year for The Road
| 
|-
| 2013
| Golden Screen TV Awards
| Outstanding Performance by an Actor in a Drama Series for One True Love 
| 
|-
| rowspan="4"|2014
| 27th Awit Awards
| Best Performance by a New Recording Artist for Self-Titled Album: Haplos
| 
|-
| Golden Screen TV Awards
| Outstanding Performance by an Actor in a Drama Series for Mundo Mo'y Akin 
| 
|-
| 6th PMPC Star Awards for Music
| New Male Recording Artist of the Year for Self-Titled Album
| 
|-
| 28th PMPC Star Awards for Television
| Best Single Performance by an Actor for Magpakailanman: The Dondon Lanuza Story
| 
|-
| rowspan="6"|2015
| rowspan="2"|29th PMPC Star Awards for Television
| Best Drama Actor for Ilustrado 
| 
|-
| Best Talent Search Program Host for Bet ng Bayan with Regine Velasquez
| 
|-
| Mega Man Nov 2015 issue
| Starmometer's 2015 Cover Guy of the Year
| 
|-
| Catholic Social Media Awards
| Catholic Social Media Achievement Awardee 
| 
|-
| Eastwood City Walk of Fame
| Walk of Fame Star
| 
|-
| 41st Metro Manila Film Festival
| Best Supporting Actor for My Bebe Love #KiligPaMore
| 
|-
| rowspan="24"|2016
| People Choice Awards (People Asia Magazine)
| People of the Year
| 
|-
| Anak TV Seal Awards 2016
| Male Makabata Star Awardee 
| 
|-
| USTv Students' Choice Awards
| Students' Choice of Variety Show Host for Eat Bulaga! 
| 
|-
| rowspan="3"|Myx Music Awards 2016
| Favorite Male Artist for Wish I May 
| 
|-
| Favorite Mellow Video for Wish I MayDirected by Louie Ignacio
| 
|-
| Favorite Guest Appearance in a Music Video for "Kapangyarihan Ng Pag-Ibig"  by Aicelle Santos
| 
|-
| rowspan="2"|47th GMMSF Box-Office Entertainment Awards
| Breakthrough Recording/Performing Artist for Wish I May
| 
|-
| Breakthrough Male Star of Philippine Movies and TV
| 
|-
| 14th Gawad Tanglaw Awards
| Best Single Performance by an Actor for Magpakailanman: The Alden Richards Story
| 
|-
| rowspan="3"| 3rd PEPList Awards – Editor's Choice
| Male TV Star of the Year 
| 
|-
| Best PEPTalk episode
| 
|-
| Male Stylish Star of the Year
| 
|-
| University of Perpetual Help System Dalta's 2nd Alta Media Icon Awards
| Most Promising Male TV Star 
| 
|-
| rowspan="2"|6th EdukCircle Awards
| 5 Most Influential Male Celebrity Endorsers of the Year
| 
|-
| Male Music Artist of the Year for Wish I May 
| 
|-
| 30th PMPC Star Awards for Television
| Best Single Performance by an Actor for Eat Bulaga! Lenten Special: God Gave Me You 
| 
|-
| rowspan="4"|8th PMPC Star Awards for Music
| Pop Album of the Year for Wish I May
| 
|-
| Album of the Year for Wish I May 
| 
|-
| Song of the Year Wish I May 
| 
|-
| Male Pop Artist of the Year for Wish I May  
| 
|-
| rowspan="3"| 29th Awit Awards
| Best Selling Album of the Year for Wish I May
| 
|-
| Most Downloaded Song 2015 for Wish I May 
| 
|-
| Most Downloaded Artist for Wish I May
| 
|-
| Philippine Association of the Record Industry
| Diamond Record for Wish I May
| 
|-
| rowspan="11"|2017
| Inside Showbiz People's Choice Awards
| Male Trending Star of 2016 
| 
|-
| Myx Music Awards 2017
| Favorite Male Artist for Say It Again Album 
| 
|-
| rowspan="2"|48th GMMSF Box-Office Entertainment Awards
| Prince of Philippine Movies for Imagine You and Me 
| 
|-
| Male Recording Artist of the Year for Say It Again Album 
| 
|-
| rowspan="2"|33rd PMPC Star Awards for Movies
| Movie Actor of the Year for Imagine You and Me 
| 
|-
| Movie Original Theme Song Interpreter of the Year for Imagine You and Me 
|  
|-
| 9th ComGuild Media Awards
| Most Loved Male Teen Endorser
| 
|-
| 7th EdukCircle Awards
| 5 Most Influential Male Celebrity Endorsers of the Year
| 
|-
| rowspan="2"|31st PMPC Star Awards for Television
| Best Single Performance by an Actor for Eat Bulaga! Lenten Special: Kapatid 
| 
|-
| Best Male TV Host for Eat Bulaga!
| 
|-
| Anak TV Seal Awards 2017
| Male Makabata Star Awardee 
| 
|-
| rowspan="12"| 2018
| 49th GMMSF Box Office Entertainment Awards
| Male Recording Artist of the Year 
| 
|-
| rowspan="1"|New York Festival 2018
| Silver Award for Alaala: A Martial Law Special 
|
|-
|rowspan="1"|U.S International Film and Video Festival 2018
| Gold Camera Docudrama for Alaala: A Martial Law Special 
| 
|-
| rowspan="3"|10th PMPC Star Awards For Music
| Male Pop Artist of the Year for Say It Again Album
| 
|-
| Pop Album of the Year for Say It Again Album
| 
|-
| Album of the Year for Say It Again Album
| 
|-
| 10th ComGuild Media Awards
| Most Popular TV Personality of the Year
| 
|-
| Garage Magazine
| Best Dressed Men in the Street Dapper 2018
| 
|-
| 8th EdukCircle Awards
| 5 Most Influential Male Celebrity Endorsers of the Year
| 
|-
| Asia's Total Entertainment Blog Starmometer
| Sexiest Man in the Philippines of 2018
| 
|-
| Anak TV Seal Awards 2018
| Male Makabata Star Awardee
| 
|-
| 32nd PMPC Star Awards for Television
| Best Male TV Host for Eat Bulaga!
| 
|-
| rowspan="33"| 2019
| Film Ambassadors’ Night 2019
| TV documentary for Alaala: A Martial Law Special
| 
|-
| Myx Music Awards 2019
| Remake of the Year for I Will Be Here Song
| 
|-
| Paragala Central Luzon Media Awards
| Best Male Recording Artist for I Will Be Here Song
| 
|-
| Inside Showbiz Awards 2019
| Showbiz Personality of the Year
| 
|-
| 35th PMPC Star Awards for Movies
| Darling of the Press
| 
|-
| rowspan="2"| 9th EdukCircle Awards
| Best Male Noontime Show Host
| 
|-
| 5 Most Influential Male Celebrity Endorsers of the Year
| 
|-
| Young Educators Convergence of Soccsksargen, Inc (YECS)5th Aral-Parangal 2019
| Movie Actor Of The Year for Hello, Love, Goodbye
| 
|-
| 14th Seoul International Drama Awards 2019
| Asian Star Prize
| 
|-
| Okada Icon Awards 2019
| First Celebrity of the Year
| 
|-
| University of Perpetual Help System Dalta's 5th Alta Media Icon Awards
| Most Influential Male TV Personality
| 
|-
| Sine Sandaan Event - Film Development Council of the Philippines
| Luminary Leading Men ng Sentenaryo
| 
|-
| rowspan="2"| 33rd PMPC Star Awards for Television
| Best Drama Actor for Victor Magtanggol
| 
|-
| Best Single Performance By An Actor for Eat Bulaga! Lenten Special: Bulawan
| 
|-
| Asia's Total Entertainment Blog Starmometer
| Sexiest Man in the Philippines of 2019
| 
|-
| 11th ComGuild Media Awards
| Most Popular TV Personality of the Year
| 
|-
| Mulat Media Awards
| Championing OFW Recognition for Hello, Love, Goodbye
| 
|-
| rowspan="3"| Rawr Awards - LionHeartTV
| Actor of the Year for  Hello, Love, Goodbye
| 
|-
| Earthy Energy: Earth Award
| 
|-
| Movie of the Year Hello, Love, Goodbye
| 
|-
| 1st Biliran Province State University Student Choice Awards For Media
| Most Popular TV Personality of the Year
| 
|-
| Anak TV Seal Awards 2019
| Male Makabata Star Awardee
| 
|-
| 2019 Australian Academy of Cinema and Television Arts
| Best Asian Film for Hello, Love, Goodbye
| 
|-
| Lustre Awards 2019
| Outstanding Fashion Collaborator of the Year for AvelxAlden
| 
|-
| 10th TV Series Craze Awards 2019
| Lead Actor of the Year
| 
|-
| rowspan="4"| 11th PMPC Star Awards for Music
| Male Recording Artist of the Year for Until I See You Again Album
| 
|-
| Male Pop Artist of the Year for Until I See You Again Album
| 
|-
| Pop Album of the Year for Until I See You Again
| 
|-
| Collaboration of the Year for Superhero Mo Song with The Ex-Battalion
| 
|-
| rowspan="2"| 2019 Comguild Academe's Choice Awards
| Male Endorser of the Year
| 
|-
| Advertisers Friendly Male Host
| 
|-
| rowspan="2"| VP Choice Awards
| Movie Actor of the Year for  Hello, Love, Goodbye
| 
|-
| Movie of the Year Hello, Love, Goodbye
| 
|-
| rowspan="27"| 2020
| rowspan="4"| 2020 Gawad Lasallianeta
| Most Influential Male Celebrity
| 
|-
| Most Outstanding Male TV Lead Dramatic Actor for The Gift
| 
|-
| Most Effective Male Celebrity Endorser 
| 
|-
| Most Outstanding Filipino Film for Hello, Love, Goodbye
| 
|-
| rowspan="5"| Guild of Educators, Mentors and Students (Hiyas ng Sining)
| Best Actor for Hello, Love, Goodbye
| 
|-
| Best Actor in a Single Performance for Eat Bulaga! Bulawan
| 
|-
| Best TV Series Actor for The Gift
| 
|-
| Best TV Series for The Gift
| 
|-
| Best Mainstream Film for Hello, Love, Goodbye
| 
|-
| rowspan="2"| 51st GMMSF Box-Office Entertainment Awards
| Phenomenal Star of Philippine Cinema for Hello, Love, Goodbye 
| 
|-
| Film Actor of the Year for Hello, Love, Goodbye 
| 
|-
| 12th Ani ng Dangal Awards 2020 (National Commission for Culture and the Arts)
| Recipient for Ani ng Dangal Awards
| 
|-
| rowspan="4"|  Inside Showbiz Awards 2020
| Best TV Actor
| 
|-
| Most Outstanding Male Artist 
| 
|-
| Best Male Endorser
| 
|-
| Sexiest Male Artist
| 
|-
| 22nd Gawad Pasado Awards
| Pinaka PASADONG Aktor for Hello, Love, Goodbye
| 
|-
| 1st Gawad Pelikula Pilipinas (GAPEFIL) 2019
| Male Breakthrough Performance for Hello, Love, Goodbye
| 
|-
| 18th Gawad Tanglaw Awards
| Film Acting Awardee for Hello, Love, Goodbye
| 
|-
| 43rd Gawad Urian Awards
| Best Actor for Hello, Love, Goodbye
| 
|-
| Pampelikulang Samahan Ng Mga Dalubguro (Philippine Normal University)
| Pinaka PASADONG Aktor for Hello, Love, Goodbye
| 
|-
| Golden Globe Awards
| New Asian Cinema for Hello, Love, Goodbye
| 
|-
| 10th EdukCircle Awards
| Most Influential Celebrity of the Decade
| 
|-
| Rawr Awards 2019 - LionHeartTV
| Actor of the Year for The Gift
| 
|-
| FAMAS Awards 2020
| Best Performances of the Year, Actor for Hello, Love, Goodbye
| 
|-
| World Music Awards (10 Songs in Philippines)
| Top 8 for Goin’ Crazy
| 
|-
| 42nd Catholic Mass Media Awards
| Best Drama Series for The Gift
| 
|-
| rowspan="16"| 2021
| 7th Urduja Heritage Film Awards
| Best Actor for Hello, Love, Goodbye
| 
|-
| 5th Guild of Educators, Mentors and Students (Hiyas ng Sining)
| Best Male Variety Show Host for All-Out Sundays
| 
|-
| 5th Film Ambassadors’ Night
| 11 New Film Ambassadors for Acting Performance (Asian Star Prize)
| 
|-
| FNET Critics Awards 2021
| Man of the Decade
| 
|-
| 2nd VP Choice Awards
| VP Cover of the Year
| 
|-
| 36th PMPC Star Awards for Movies
| Movie Actor of the Year for Hello, Love, Goodbye
| 
|-
| PEP 15 Greatest Actors of Philippine Cinema in Leading Roles
| Greatest Movie Actors in Leading Roles (Top 11)
| 
|-
| New York Festivals TV and Film Awards
| 2021 Finalist for Alden's Reality
| 
|-
| 3rd Laguna Excellence Awards
| Outstanding Male Recording Artist of the Year for Goin’ Crazy
| 
|-
| rowspan="2" | 34th PMPC Star Awards for Television
| Best Drama Actor for The Gift
| 
|-
| Best Male TV host for Eat Bulaga!
| 
|-
| TC Candler: Village Pipol Magazine 
| The 100 Most Handsome Faces of 2021
| 
|-
| rowspan="2" | PH Choice Awards
| Top 20 Male Host of Year 2021
| 
|-
| Top 1 Male Recording Artist of the Year
| 
|-
| 12th PMPC Star Awards for Music
| Plaque of Appreciation for PMPC's Awit ng Pandemya Benefit Concert
| 
|-
| 2021 Tag Awards Chicago
| Best Actor for The World Between Us
| 
|-
| rowspan="13"| 2022
| 6th Guild of Educators, Mentors and Students (Hiyas ng Sining)
| Best Performance in a Lead Role for The World Between Us
| 
|-
| rowspan="2" | 13th PMPC Star Awards for Music
| Male Recording Artist of the Year for Goin’ Crazy
| 
|-
| Male Concert Performer of the Year for Alden’s Reality
| 
|-
| LPU Golden Laurel Media Awards 2022
| Most Inspiring Social Media Personality 
| 
|-
| Asean Excellence Achievers Awards 2022
| Most Loved Male TV and Movie Personality of the Year
| 
|-
| TC Candler
| The 100 Most Handsome Faces of 2022
| 
|-
| PHTV Fan Awards 2022
| Favorite Drama Actor
| 
|-
| 2022 Tag Awards Chicago
| Best Actor for Start-Up PH
| 
|-
| Rawr Awards 2022 - LionHeartTV
| Favorite Performer
| 
|-
| rowspan="3"| 5th Gawad Lasallianeta
| Most Outstanding Actor in a Drama Series for Start-Up PH
| 
|-
| Most Influential Male Filipino Celebrity
| 
|-
| Most Outstanding Brand Endorser
| 
|-
| Esquire Philippines’ 2022 Man At His Best Awards
| Entertainer of the Year
| 
|-
| rowspan="5" | 2023
| rowspan="2" | 7th Guild of Educators, Mentors and Students (Hiyas ng Sining)
| Best Performance by an Actor in a Lead Role for Start-Up PH
| 
|-
| Best TV Program Host for All-Out Sundays
| 
|-
| 4th VP Choice Awards
| TV Actor of the Year
| 
|-
| rowspan="2" | 2022 Philippine Esports Awards
| 2022 Positive Community Influencer of the Year
| 
|-
| 2022 Esports Personality of the Year
| 
|-
|}

References

External links
 
 Sparkle profile

1992 births
Living people
Tagalog people
People from Santa Rosa, Laguna
Filipino Roman Catholics
21st-century Filipino male actors
Filipino male television actors
Filipino male film actors
21st-century Filipino male singers
Filipino television personalities
English-language singers from the Philippines
21st-century Filipino businesspeople
Filipino male models
Filipino male comedians
Filipino people of American descent
Filipino people of English descent
Filipino people of Kapampangan descent
Male actors from Laguna (province)
Participants in Philippine reality television series
StarStruck (Philippine TV series) participants
GMA Network personalities
Universal Records (Philippines) artists
GMA Music artists
Filipino television variety show hosts
Filipino television presenters